The 21st National Television Awards were held at The O2 Arena on 20 January 2016. The awards were hosted by Dermot O'Leary.

Performances
 Gloria Gaynor – "I Will Survive/Survivor"
 Fleur East – "More and More"
 Raya Yarbrough - "The Skye Boat Song"

Awards

References

External links
The National Television Awards official website
The O2 official website

National Television Awards
N
2016 in British television
N
National Television Awards
N